Temnora bouyeri is a moth of the family Sphingidae. It is endemic to the Democratic Republic of the Congo.

References

bouyeri
Moths described in 2003
Endemic fauna of the Democratic Republic of the Congo
Lepidoptera of the Democratic Republic of the Congo
Moths of Sub-Saharan Africa